Laurent Sciarra (born 8 August 1973) is a former French professional basketball player.

Professional career
Sciarra began his professional career in 1990, with Hyères-Toulon Var Basket, and he moved to Paris Basket Racing in 1993. He played with PBR until 1997, when he was a member of the club's French League championship season.  Sciarra then moved abroad for one season, playing with Ciudad de Huelva in Spain, and Pallacanestro Treviso in Italy, before returning to Paris.

In 2001, Sciarra again moved abroad, and spent a season with Panionios in Greece.  Following two more seasons with Paris Basket Racing, Sciarra played with the French club BCM Gravelines, for one season.  In 2005, he began to play with the French club JDA Dijon, where he stayed until his transfer to French club Entente Orléanaise 45, in 2008.

National team career
Sciarra played internationally for the senior men's French national basketball team. He was a member of France's silver-medal winning squad at the 2000 Summer Olympic Games. He was the best scorer of the 2000 Olympics final, as he scored 19 points against Team USA.

External links

1973 births
Living people
ASVEL Basket players
Basketball players at the 2000 Summer Olympics
BCM Gravelines players
Élan Béarnais players
French men's basketball players
French expatriate sportspeople in Greece
French expatriate sportspeople in Italy
French expatriate sportspeople in Spain
HTV Basket players
JDA Dijon Basket players
Liga ACB players
Olympic basketball players of France
Orléans Loiret Basket players
Olympic medalists in basketball
Olympic silver medalists for France
Pallacanestro Treviso players
Panionios B.C. players
Paris Racing Basket players
Medalists at the 2000 Summer Olympics
Point guards